The Third Millennium Bible (TMB), also known as the New Authorized Version, is a 1998 minor update of the King James Version of the Bible.  Unlike the New King James Version, it does not alter the language significantly from the 1611 version, retaining Jacobean grammar (including "thees" and "thous"), but it does attempt to replace some of the vocabulary which no longer would make sense to a modern reader.

Characteristics

Canon 
The TMB, like the original KJV in 1611, contains the Apocryphal/Deuterocanonical books of the Old Testament in between the Old and New Testaments. This has helped win it some support among traditionalist Anglicans and Eastern Orthodox Christians. A version without the Apocrypha (and with formatting changes) is known as the 21st Century King James Version.

Word updating 
An example of word updating from Ezra 9:3

External links
 Third Millennium Bible - Official Site
 KJ21 on BibleGateway.com - The complete text of the 21st Century King James Version, plus version, copyright and publisher information
TMB with Apocrypha on BibleStudyTools.com

1998 books
Bible translations into English
1998 in Christianity